ACMG may refer to:

 Association of Canadian Mountain Guides
 American College of Medical Genetics and Genomics